Le Bec-Thomas is a village in the department of Eure of the Normandy region in France. Le Bec-Thomas is part of the canton of Grand Bourgtheroulde and the arrondissement of Bernay. The INSEE code for Le Bec-Thomas is 27053, and the Le Bec-Thomas zip code is 27370.

Geography 
Le Bec-Thomas has an approximate altitude of 145 meters and an area of 1.40 km ². Its latitude and longitude are 49.234 degrees North and 0.983 degrees East.

Population and housing 
The population of Le Bec-Thomas was 221 in 1999, 229 in 2006 and 224 in 2007. The population density of Le Bec-Thomas is 160.00 inhabitants per km².

The number of houses was 88 in 2007. These  consist of 80 main residences, six second or occasional homes and two vacant homes.

See also
Communes of the Eure department

References

Communes of Eure